The Clarksville Confederate Monument is located in the south-central section of Oakland Cemetery in Clarksville, Arkansas. It is a white marble obelisk,  in height, which is  square at its base. The lower portion of the obelisk is carved with an inscription commemorating the Confederate war dead, and its spire is adorned with a floral pattern. It was placed about 1902 by the local chapter of the United Daughters of the Confederacy.

The inscription reads:

SACRED TO THE
MEMORY OF
OUR
CONFEDERATE
DEAD
1861-1865
 	

The monument was listed on the National Register of Historic Places in 1999.

See also
National Register of Historic Places listings in Johnson County, Arkansas

References

Buildings and structures completed in 1902
Buildings and structures in Johnson County, Arkansas
Confederate States of America monuments and memorials in Arkansas
Monuments and memorials on the National Register of Historic Places in Arkansas
National Register of Historic Places in Johnson County, Arkansas
Neoclassical architecture in Arkansas
Obelisks in the United States
Tourist attractions in Johnson County, Arkansas
1902 establishments in Arkansas